Watch Your Step is the compilation album of earlier releases and rarities songs of hardcore band Raised Fist.

Track listing

Stronger Than Ever 
Reduction of Hate 
Torn Apart 
I've Tried 
Next 
The Answer 
Time for Changes 
Soldiers of Today 
E-skile 
Too Late to Change 
Respect 
To Make Up My Mind 
Give Yourself a Chance 
Break Free 
Stand Up and Fight 
Flame Still Burns 
Maintain 
Untruth 
Peak

Musicians

 Marco Eronen - Guitar
 Daniel Holmberg - Guitar
 Oskar Karlsson – drums
 Andreas "Josse" Johansson - Bass
 Alexander "Alle" Rajkovic - Vocals

Raised Fist albums
2001 compilation albums
Burning Heart Records compilation albums